Olteanca may refer to several villages in Romania:

 Olteanca, a village in Pădina Mare Commune, Mehedinți County
 Olteanca, a village in Segarcea-Vale Commune, Teleorman County
 Olteanca, a village in Glăvile Commune, Vâlcea County
 Olteanca, a village in Lădești Commune, Vâlcea County